Éva Ráduly-Zörgő (Éva Ileana Ráduly-Zörgő; born October 23, 1954, in Cluj) is a former javelin thrower from Romania, who set her personal best in 1980, throwing 68.80 metres. She competed in three consecutive Summer Olympics (1972, 1976 and 1980) for her native country.

External links
 
 

1954 births
Living people
Romanian female javelin throwers
Athletes (track and field) at the 1972 Summer Olympics
Athletes (track and field) at the 1976 Summer Olympics
Athletes (track and field) at the 1980 Summer Olympics
Olympic athletes of Romania
Universiade medalists in athletics (track and field)
Romanian sportspeople of Hungarian descent
Universiade gold medalists for Romania
Medalists at the 1975 Summer Universiade
Medalists at the 1979 Summer Universiade
Sportspeople from Cluj-Napoca